Inape homologa is a species of moth of the family Tortricidae. It is found in Ecuador (Loja Province) and Peru.

References

External links

Moths described in 2006
Moths of South America
homologa
Taxa named by Józef Razowski